The 1878 Manitoba general election was held on December 18, 1878 to elect representatives to the Legislative Assembly of Manitoba.

References 

1878
1878 elections in Canada
1878 in Manitoba
December 1878 events